The St. Louis Public Library is a municipal public library system in the city of St. Louis, Missouri. It operates sixteen locations, including the main Central Library location.

History
In 1865, Ira Divoll, the superintendent of the St. Louis Public School system, created a subscription library in the public school library that would later evolve into the St. Louis Public Library. Divoll believed that a library should work in tandem with the public education system and offer citizens an opportunity for self-improvement and culture.

In 1869, Divoll’s subscription library moved to the Board of Education building. The library consisted of 4 staff members who offered reference services 12 hours a day. The library also encouraged children to visit, and had no age restrictions as did most libraries of the day.

Due to rapid growth of the collection, which grew from 1,500 volumes in 1865 to 90,000 volumes by 1893, the library required more space. In 1893, the library moved into a new space on the top floors of the new Board of Education building. Also in 1893, the citizens of St. Louis voted to move the administration of the library to an independent board, supported by a property tax. This vote enabled the library to operate without subscription fees and be open to all St. Louis residents.

The library occupied its space in the Board of Education building until 1909, as the Central Library was being constructed. The Board of Education building wasn’t large enough to accommodate the library's growing collection. It was during this time that the library began its role as a lending library, allowing the public to ‘check out’ and take books home.

In 1901, Andrew Carnegie  made a large donation which was used for expansion, including the building which is currently the Central Library. By this time the collection included 90,000 books. By 1938 the collection included 900,000 items, and by 2014, 4.6 million items.

Locations
The St. Louis Public Library operates 17 libraries, including the main Central Library. Branches include Baden, Barr, Buder, Cabanne, Carondelet, Carpenter, Central Express, Charing Cross, Compton, Julia Davis, Divoll, Kingshighway, Machacek, Marketplace, Schlafly, and Walnut Park. In addition to the Central Library building, Barr, Cabanne, Carpenter and Carondelet branch buildings were Carnegie libraries.

Central Library

The Central Library building at 13th and Olive was built in 1912 on a location formerly occupied by the St. Louis Exposition and Music Hall and was designed by Cass Gilbert. The main library for the city's public library system has an oval central pavilion surrounded by four light courts. The outer facades of the free-standing building are of lightly rusticated Maine granite. The Olive Street front is disposed like a colossal arcade, with contrasting marble bas-relief panels. A projecting three-bay central block, like a pared-down triumphal arch, provides a monumental entrance. At the rear, the Central Library faces a sunken garden. The interiors feature some light-transmitting glass floors. The ceiling of the Periodicals Room is modified from Michelangelo's ceiling in the Laurentian Library. Renovation and expansion of the building began in 2010 and finished in 2012.

Services
 Audio-Visual material including DVDs, Blu-Ray, VHS tapes, books on CD, Playaways, music CDs 
 Children's sections
 Computer visitor passes
 Computers with high speed internet, printing, word processing capabilities
 Creative experience digital makerspace
 Digital services (Libby, Hoopla, Freegal Music)
 Interlibrary loan (ILL)
 Launchpads (tablets for checkout that feature apps for children with an educational theme)
 Neighborhood specific material
 Notary services
 Passport processing
 Periodicals & nationwide/worldwide newspapers
 Reference services
 Programs, special events, and author visits/book signings
 Video games (PS4, Wii, Wii U, Xbox One, Xbox 360)
 Voter registration

See also

List of Carnegie libraries in Missouri
Frederick M. Crunden

References

External links
St. Louis Public Library Archives, digitized historical materials held in the Library's Archives, including scrapbooks and photographs

Saint Louis Public Library

Public libraries in Missouri
Libraries in Greater St. Louis
Cass Gilbert buildings
Landmarks of St. Louis
Education in St. Louis
Government of St. Louis
1865 establishments in Missouri
Libraries established in 1865
Buildings and structures in St. Louis